Vallüla (2,813 m) is a mountain of the Silvretta Alps on the border between Tyrol and Vorarlberg, Austria. It is located above the Bielerhöhe pass, from where most climbs start from.

In Popular Culture 
In W.G. Sebald's 1995 book The Rings of Saturn, he describes the Vallüla massif in lucid detail as it appeared to him in a dream. Sebald had previously seen the mountain as a child while on a visit to the Montafon and felt that his subconscious had retrieved the accurate description from his memory decades later.

See also
Vallülasee

References

Mountains of the Alps
Mountains of Tyrol (state)
Mountains of Vorarlberg